Real Life is the third and final studio album by American country music artist Jeff Carson. It contains the single "Real Life (I Never Was the Same Again)", a top 20 hit on the Billboard country music charts in mid-2001 and Carson's first Top 40 country hit since 1996's "Holdin' Onto Something". None of the other singles from this album were Top 40 hits. After that album's release, Carson retired from the music business to become a police officer.

Justin Niebank produced tracks 1, 3, and 4, with songwriter Max T. Barnes producing the rest.

Track listing

Personnel
Kelly Back – electric guitar
Max T. Barnes – bass guitar, piano, electric guitar, keyboards, background vocals
Larry Beaird – acoustic guitar
Jeff Carson – lead vocals
Eric Darken – percussion
Stuart Duncan – fiddle
Paul Franklin – pedal steel guitar
Vicki Hampton – background vocals
Tony Harrell – keyboards
Aubrey Haynie – fiddle
Yvonne Hodges – background vocals
B. James Lowry – acoustic guitar
Brent Mason – electric guitar
Chris McHugh – drums
Nashville String Machine – strings
Steve Nathan – keyboards
Justin Niebank – keyboards
Michael Rhodes – bass guitar
John Wesley Ryles – background vocals
Buddy Andrews – pedal steel guitar
Leslie Satcher – background vocals
Lisa Silver – background vocals
Catherine Styron – keyboards
Lonnie Wilson – drums
Glenn Worf – bass guitar

Chart performance

References

2001 albums
Jeff Carson albums
Curb Records albums